Unterwaldhausen is a town in the district of Ravensburg in Baden-Württemberg in Germany.

References

Ravensburg (district)